Aleksey Nosko (born 15 August 1996) is a Belarusian professional football player currently playing for Bunyodkor on loan from BATE Borisov.

Honours
BATE Borisov
Belarusian Cup winner: 2020–21
Belarusian Super Cup winner: 2022

References

External links
 
 
 Profile at Neman website

1996 births
Living people
Belarusian footballers
Association football defenders
Belarusian expatriate footballers
Expatriate footballers in Kazakhstan
Expatriate footballers in Uzbekistan
FC Neman Grodno players
FC Smorgon players
FC Energetik-BGU Minsk players
FC Dynamo Brest players
FC BATE Borisov players
FC Torpedo-BelAZ Zhodino players
FC Maktaaral players
FC Bunyodkor players